Yolande Geddes-Hall is a Jamaican sportswoman who represented her country at four different sports. In cricket, she played as a wicket-keeper and right-handed batter. She appeared in five One Day Internationals, as captain, for Jamaica at the 1973 Women's Cricket World Cup, and ten Test matches and two One Day Internationals for the West Indies between 1976 and 1979. She also played netball, table tennis and softball for Jamaica.

References

External links
 
 

Living people
Date of birth missing (living people)
Year of birth missing (living people)
West Indian women cricketers
West Indies women Test cricketers
West Indies women One Day International cricketers
Jamaican women cricketers
Jamaican women cricket captains
Jamaican netball players